Larry Irvin Bignell (born January 7, 1950) is a Canadian retired professional Ice hockey defenceman from Edmonton, Alberta.

Career 
Bignell was selected by the Pittsburgh Penguins in the second round, 35th overall, in the 1970 NHL Amateur Draft. He appeared in 20 NHL games for the Penguins in 1973–74, scoring three assists, and three games in the 1975 Stanley Cup Playoffs. Bignell also played 41 games in the World Hockey Association for the Denver Spurs/Ottawa Civics in 1975–76. The majority of his professional career was spent in the American Hockey League. He retired in 1977.

Career statistics

Regular season and playoffs

References

External links
 

1950 births
Living people
Amarillo Wranglers players
Baltimore Clippers players
Canadian ice hockey defencemen
Denver Spurs (WHA) players
Edmonton Oil Kings (WCHL) players
Hershey Bears players
Ottawa Civics players
Pittsburgh Penguins draft picks
Pittsburgh Penguins players
Richmond Robins players
Ice hockey people from Edmonton